Gargantilla del Lozoya y Pinilla de Buitrago is a municipality of the Community of Madrid, Spain. It is the municipality with the longest official name in Spain.

References

External links

Municipalities in the Community of Madrid